Red Bluff Lake or Red Buff Reservoir is a reservoir in Pecos, Texas.

Red Bluff Lake may also refer to:
Red Bluff Lake, a lake formed by the Red Bluff Diversion Dam in Tehama County, California
Red Bluff Lake, a lake in Red Bluff, South Carolina